Edward Semwanga  is a Uganda midfielder who played for Uganda in the 1978 African Cup of Nations.

External links
11v11 Profile

Living people
Ugandan footballers
Uganda international footballers
1978 African Cup of Nations players
Association football midfielders
Year of birth missing (living people)